Czartki may refer to the following places:
Czartki, Kalisz County in Greater Poland Voivodeship (west-central Poland)
Czartki, Gmina Sieradz in Łódź Voivodeship (central Poland)
Czartki, Gmina Warta in Łódź Voivodeship (central Poland)
Czartki, Środa Wielkopolska County in Greater Poland Voivodeship (west-central Poland)